Georgina Morgan (born 15 May 1993) is an Australian field hockey player.

She represented her country at the 2016 Summer Olympics in Rio de Janeiro.

Early life
Morgan was born in Armidale, New South Wales. She began playing hockey when she was six years old.

Education
Morgan is currently studying at the University of Sydney, completing a Bachelor of Applied Science, majoring in Exercise Physiology.

Career

State hockey
As of 2018, Morgan represents her home state, New South Wales in the Australian Hockey League. Most recently winning a gold medal with the side in the 2018 edition of the event.

National team
Morgan made her senior international debut in 2014, in a test series against New Zealand, in Wellington, New Zealand.

In the Summer of 2018, Morgan spent time away from the national squad in Canberra, recovering from a toe injury she sustained in 2017. Morgan returned from injury to compete at the 2018 World Cup. Following this she sustained another injury, ruling her out of competition for the remainder of 2018.

Morgan returned to the national team in 2019 for the FIH Pro League where she won a silver medal.

International goals

References

External links
 
 
 

1993 births
Living people
Australian female field hockey players
Field hockey players at the 2016 Summer Olympics
Olympic field hockey players of Australia
Female field hockey defenders
People from Armidale
Sportswomen from New South Wales
21st-century Australian women